Édouard Beaupré, (January 9, 1881 – July 3, 1904) was a Canadian circus and freak show giant, professional wrestler, strongman, and star of Barnum and Bailey's circus.

Life

Édouard Beaupré was born in the southern Saskatchewan town of Willow Bunch on January 9, 1881. He was the first of 20 children born to Gaspard Beaupré and Florestine Piché, a Métis. He stopped going to school at this time. He spoke French, English, Métchif, Cree and Sioux.

His father worked as a freighter for the trader Jean-Louis Légaré, who was a cattle and horse rancher and also Beaupré's godfather. For several years he accompanied his father on his trips to Moose Jaw, Regina and Montana.

Abandoning life on the ranch, Beaupré began touring. He displayed his strength by bending iron bars and lifting horses onto his shoulders. He toured from Winnipeg to Montreal and stayed for a time in California. While in Montreal, on March 25, 1901, Beaupré wrestled Louis Cyr, a famous French Canadian strongman. The match was very short, with Cyr winning. His neck measured 21 inches in circumference and his hands were 12 and a half inches from the wrist to finger tips. His chest measured 56 inches while his shoes had to be custom made for his size 22 feet. In December 1903, he measured

Death

Beaupré signed a contract on July 1, 1904, with the Barnum and Bailey circus to appear at the St. Louis World's Fair in St. Louis, Missouri. However, just two days later on July 3, 1904, he died at age 23 of a pulmonary hemorrhage, a complication of tuberculosis.

Travels after death
 
At the circus' request, the undertaker embalmed Beaupré's body. However, the circus refused to pay, so they decided to preserve the body which they then put on display in St. Louis. Through an unknown connection, the body made it to the Museum of Eden in Montreal and was put on display there, but the exposition drew such a crowd that the authorities shut it down. The body was then passed on to a Montreal circus, but they quickly went bankrupt and dumped the body in a warehouse. It sat there until 1907, when two kids came across the body as they were playing in the warehouse. The Université de Montréal claimed the body, and, after doing some research and an autopsy, mummified Beaupré's body and placed it in a glass display case in the university.

Burial
The family only discovered Beaupré's body was in Montreal in 1967, and so in 1975 began the process to try to return the body to Willow Bunch for a proper burial. The university refused and claimed rights over the body, saying that they wanted to continue to perform research and did not want the body displayed anywhere else. In 1989 the family once again tried, this time bringing the media with them as well to put some pressure on the university. This time the effort worked, and so the university decided they could cremate the remains, to prevent anyone from grave-robbing the body. It took two big urns to contain Beaupré's ashes. Finally, in 1990, the body of le Géant Beaupré or le Géant de Willow-Bunch was brought back to Willow Bunch. The family had a memorial service, and his remains now lie in front of the Willow Bunch Museum.

References

External links
 The Tallest Man: Édouard Beaupré 
 Biography and family history of Édouard Beaupré  at Canada's Digital Collections

1881 births
1904 deaths
Canadian circus performers
People with gigantism
Fransaskois people
Sideshow performers
Tuberculosis deaths in Missouri
20th-century deaths from tuberculosis
Canadian male wrestlers
Professional wrestlers from Saskatchewan